"You Needed Me" is a song written by Randy Goodrum, who describes it as being about "unconditional undeserved love". It was a number one hit single in the United States in 1978 for Canadian singer Anne Murray, for which she won a Grammy Award. In 1999, Irish pop band Boyzone recorded a hit cover of the song that hit number one on the UK Singles Chart.

Original Anne Murray version
"You Needed Me" was first recorded by singer Anne Murray in 1978. The song peaked at number one on the Billboard Hot 100 chart and revitalized her career after several years of declining popularity as it became her first Top 40 US single since her 1974 remake of The Beatles' "You Won't See Me". The song, included on her 1978 album Let's Keep It That Way, was also a top-five country single and won Song of the Year at the Academy of Country Music awards, and is her most successful single in the United Kingdom, where it made the top 30. Murray is quoted in The Billboard Book of Number One Hits by Fred Bronson as saying she was not surprised by the song's success, as she knew from the start the song would be a hit because she broke down in tears the first time she tried to sing it.

Although the song reached number one on the Billboard Hot 100 chart (and is her only song to top that chart), it never topped the two Billboard charts where Murray has had the most success—Country and Adult Contemporary. However, it spent a then-record 36 weeks on the Adult Contemporary chart, a record for chart longevity that stood until 1990. The song spent 10 weeks at number one in Malaysia.

The song earned Murray the Grammy Award for Best Female Pop Vocal Performance at the 21st Grammy Awards, the first to be awarded to a Canadian artist. The single was certified Platinum in Canada and Gold in the US. 

Anne Murray re-recorded the song with Shania Twain for Murray's 2007 album Duets: Friends & Legends.

The song was featured in an ongoing storyline on the CBS soap Guiding Light in 1980–81, as a theme song for the characters Kelly Nelson and Morgan Richards. In 2013, the song was performed by Seth MacFarlane in character as Stewie Griffin on the Family Guy episode "Chris Cross", in which Anne Murray herself guest-starred.

Chart performance

Weekly charts

Year-end charts

Boyzone version

"You Needed Me" was covered by Irish boy band Boyzone in 1999. It was released as the second single from their album By Request. It became their sixth and final single to reach number one on the UK Singles Chart, outselling Spice Girl Geri Halliwell's debut single, "Look at Me", by 748 copies. The song received a silver disc for shipping 200,000 copies in the UK.

Track listings
Irish maxi-CD single
 "You Needed Me"
 "When the Going Gets Tough"
 "You Needed Me" (Jewels & Stone Remix)
 "Megamix (Love to Infinity)"

UK CD1
 "You Needed Me"
 "Words Can't Describe"
 "Megamix (Love to Infinity)"

UK CD2
 "You Needed Me"
 "You Needed Me" (Jewels & Stone Remix)
 "Too Late Tonight"
 "You Needed Me" (video)

UK cassette single
 "You Needed Me"
 "Words Can't Describe"

Credits and personnel
Credits are lifted from the By Request album booklet.

Studio
 Engineered and programmed at Rokstone Studios (London, England)

Personnel

 Randy Goodrum – writing
 Wayne Hector – additional backing vocals, backing vocal arrangement
 Ali Tennant – additional backing vocals
 Yvonne John Lewis – additional backing vocals
 John Matthews – additional backing vocals

 Paul Gendler – guitars
 Steve Mac – production, backing vocal arrangement
 Chris Laws – engineering, programming
 Matt Howe – mix engineeing
 Richard Niles – string arrangement

Charts

Weekly charts

Year-end charts

Certifications

Other versions
 The New Seekers, a late 1978 single.
 Burl Ives - included in the album The Magic Balladeer  (1993).
 Daniel O'Donnell - in his album Songs of Inspiration  (1996).
 Howard Keel - for his 1985 album Reminiscing – The Howard Keel Collection. This  peaked at #20 in the UK album chart during a 12-week stay.
 Lynn Anderson recorded her version of "You Needed Me" for the 1983 album Up Close. The song was subsequently included in various country and love song compilation albums that include her.
Lynne Perrie recorded a version for the 1987 Coronation Street album.
 Patti Page - for her album Best Country Songs  (2008).
 Perry Como  - Perry Como Live on Tour (1981)
 Val Doonican - in the album It's Good to See You (1988).
 Vic Damone - included in his album Now (1981).
 Cilla Black - included on her Especially for You album (1980)
 Sissel Kyrkjebø recorded a Norwegian version called "Jeg Trenger Deg" (I Need You) for her 1986 debut album Sissel.
 Bill Pearce recorded on trombone.
 Kenny Rogers, Dottie West - included in the album Classics (1978)
 Alka Yagnik, Kumar Sanu suno zaraa, suno zaraa, hawaaon mein yeh kaisee hai sadaa - in the film Bada Din (1998); music by Jatin-Lalit

References

1978 singles
1999 singles
Songs written by Randy Goodrum
Anne Murray songs
Boyzone songs
Lynn Anderson songs
Shania Twain songs
Song recordings produced by Jim Ed Norman
Billboard Hot 100 number-one singles
Number-one singles in New Zealand
Number-one singles in Scotland
UK Singles Chart number-one singles
RPM Top Singles number-one singles
Capitol Records singles
Canadian soft rock songs
Pop ballads
1970s ballads
1978 songs
Polydor Records singles
Grammy Award for Best Female Pop Vocal Performance